Graphops comosa, known generally as the Monahans sandhill chrysomelid or long-haired graphops, is a species of leaf beetle. It is found in southeast New Mexico and the adjacent region of Texas.

Adult beetles of G. comosa have the heaviest pubescence of any in the genus. Their coarse white hairs entirely conceal the punctuation on the elytra, giving the beetles a grayish appearance similar to that of Glyptoscelis species. The specific name, comosa, is Latin for "with long hair".

References

Further reading

 

Eumolpinae
Articles created by Qbugbot
Taxa named by Doris Holmes Blake
Beetles described in 1955
Beetles of the United States